The Breese-Reynolds House is a historic house located at 601 South Street in Hoosick, Rensselaer County, New York.

Description and history 
The house was built in about 1825 and consists of a -story, five-by-three-bay, gable-roofed brick main block with a rectangular, -story wood-framed wing. The wing was added in the mid-19th century. The main block has a slate roof. It is an example of a transitional Federal/Greek Revival–style dwelling.

It was listed on the National Register of Historic Places on March 1, 2007.

References

Houses on the National Register of Historic Places in New York (state)
Federal architecture in New York (state)
Greek Revival houses in New York (state)
Houses completed in 1825
Houses in Rensselaer County, New York
National Register of Historic Places in Rensselaer County, New York